Boyan Vodenitcharov (born 1960) is a Bulgarian pianist and composer.

While a student in Sofia's State Conservatory (where he was later a teacher) he won the 1982 National Composition Competition, and was awarded 3rd prizes in the XXXIII Concorso Busoni and the X Queen Elisabeth competition. After finishing his studies he began an international concert career.

In 1991 Vodenitcharov settled in Belgium. He is a teacher at Brussels' Koninklijk Conservatorium.

In addition to classical works, he has released two albums with Belgian saxophone player Steve Houben that mix classical music and jazz: Les Valses (2003 on the Mogno label) and Darker Scales (2011 on Igloo Records).

References
Les Amis de l'Académie de Musique de Mont-sur-Marchienne

Bulgarian classical pianists
Prize-winners of the Queen Elisabeth Competition
1960 births
Living people
Bulgarian composers
Bulgarian expatriates in Belgium
Academic staff of the Royal Conservatory of Liège
Academic staff of the Royal Conservatory of Brussels
21st-century classical pianists